The winners of the 1999–2000 Asian Cup Winners' Cup, the association football competition run by the Asian Football Confederation, are listed below.

First round

West Asia

|}
1 Al Arabi withdrew

East Asia

|}

Second round

West Asia

|}

East Asia

|}
1 Sembawang Rangers withdrew before 1st leg

Quarterfinals

West Asia

|}
1 Al Ahli withdrew for the semifinals, and were replaced by Navbahor Namangan; Al Ahli were banned for one year from Asian club competitions.

East Asia

|}

Semifinals

Third place match

Final

References
 Asian Cup Winners Cup 2000

Asian Cup Winners' Cup
2
2